The Zytek ZG348 engine is a 3.4-litre, normally-aspirated, V8 racing engine, developed and produced by Zytek for sports car racing. The ZG348's rev-limit was about 10,000 rpm, and produces its power output of  @ 9,500 rpm, and peak torque of  @ 8,500 rpm.

Applications
Reynard 02S
Ginetta G50
Ginetta-Zytek GZ09S

References

Engines by model
Gasoline engines by model
Zytek engines
V8 engines